Kohara is a Japanese surname. Notable people with the surname include:

, Japanese idol and singer
 Kazuno Kohara, Japanese author and illustrator 
, Japanese voice actress
, Japanese footballer
, Japanese voice actress and guitarist
, Japanese singer and actor

Japanese-language surnames